Syngatha is a genus of moths of the family Noctuidae. The genus was erected by George Thomas Bethune-Baker in 1913.

Species
Syngatha argyropasta (Hampson, 1918) Malawi, Tanzania, South Africa
Syngatha colossa Hacker, 2019 Nigeria
Syngatha eremita Hacker, Fiebig & Stadie, 2019 Ethiopia
Syngatha eremochroa Hacker, Fiebig & Stadie, 2019 Uganda
Syngatha flavipars (Hampson, 1916) Somalia, Ethiopia, Zaire, Uganda
Syngatha flaviscripta Hacker, Fiebig & Stadie, 2019 Uganda, Nigeria
Syngatha flavitincta (Hampson, 1914) Ghana, Liberia, Kenya
Syngatha geometriana (Viette, 1981) Madagascar
Syngatha hannarolandae Hacker, 2019 Uganda
Syngatha latiflavaria (Swinhoe, 1904) Malawi, Angola, Zimbabwe
Syngatha parascotoides Hacker, 2019 Ethiopia
Syngatha phoenichrysa Hacker, Fiebig & Staide, 2019 Uganda
Syngatha phoenicoxantha (Hampson, 1914) South Africa
Syngatha pyrrhoxantha Hacker, Fiebig & Hacker, 2019 South Africa
Syngatha semipurpurea Hampson, 1918 Mozambique
Syngatha semipurpurula Hacker, 2019 Ghana, Burkina Faso, Ethiopia
Syngatha simplicicata Hacker, Fiebig & Stadie, 2019 Ethiopia
Syngatha subflavipars Hacker, 2019 South Africa

References

Acontiinae